Happy Go Lucky  is a 1987 Hong Kong romantic comedy directed by Lee Tim-sing and starring Tony Leung Chiu-wai, Kara Hui, Clarence Fok, Betty Mak, and Yammie Lam. It is produced by Orange Sky Golden Harvest. The film premiered in British Hong Kong on 21 May 1987.

Cast
 Tony Leung Chiu-wai as Wei 
 Kara Hui as Jackie
 Clarence Fok
 Betty Mak
 Yammie Lam

Others
 Hung Wah Leung
 Danny Summer
 Kwan Hoi-san
 Yanzi Shi
 Siu Ping Cheng
 Wang Ban Poon
 Maria Chan
 Lap Ban Chan
 Kuo Hua Chang
 Bo-San Chow
 Tau Chu
 Wai-Jan Koo
 Shirley Kwan
 Sam Lee
 Tim-Sing Lee
 Hung Wah Tony Leung
 Hsin Liang
 Kei Mai
 Tsui-Han Mak
 Bruce Mang
 Danny Poon
 Yee Seung
 Tai Wo Tang
 Tien Tsai Wei
 Chi-Keung Wong
 Kam Bo Wong
 Man Shing Wong
 Siu Ming Wong
 Boon Chai Yat
 Hsiang Lin Yin

Release
Happy Go Lucky was released on 21 May 1987, in British Hong Kong.

References

External links
 
 
 

1987 films
1980s Cantonese-language films
1980s Mandarin-language films
Hong Kong romantic comedy films
Films set in Hong Kong
Films shot in Hong Kong
1987 romantic comedy films
1980s Hong Kong films